Michael E. Rocque (1899 – 6 December 1965) was an Indian field hockey player who competed in the 1928 Summer Olympics.

In 1928 he was a member of the Indian field hockey team, which won the gold medal.

References

External links
 

1899 births
1965 deaths
People from Jabalpur
Field hockey players from Madhya Pradesh
Olympic field hockey players of India
Field hockey players at the 1928 Summer Olympics
Olympic gold medalists for India
Anglo-Indian people
Indian male field hockey players
Medalists at the 1928 Summer Olympics
Olympic medalists in field hockey